Anandapur, Bangladesh is a village in Chandpur District in the Chittagong Division of eastern Bangladesh.

References

Populated places in Chandpur District